Isolated Warrior is a 1991 video game developed by KID and published in Japan by Vap, in North America by NTVIC, and Europe by Nintendo. It falls in the shooter genre, although its gameplay also includes elements reminiscent of platforming, while it features isometric projection, similar to Sega's Zaxxon.

Isolated Warrior received mostly positive reception from critics since its initial release; some drew comparison with Zaxxon due to the use of isometric projection, with praise being given to aspects such as the presentation, visuals and frenetic action, but other felt mixed in regards to the sound, difficulty and replay value, while common complaints were geared towards the amount of flickering that occurs when too many objects are present on-screen. Retrospective commentary has been mixed.

Gameplay

The game is shown entirely from an overhead isometric perspective, similar to games like Viewpoint or the Diablo series. The player must collect weapon upgrades and operate various machines to combat the alien enemies.

Various obstacles, such as pitfalls and land mines, must be avoided. There is a boss battle at the end of each level, and sometimes mid-level as well. The player's progress in the game can be saved using a password system. Between some levels, images and text are displayed revealing Maverick's thoughts or reminiscence about his life.

Plot
The game's plot takes place on a planet outside of Earth's galaxy called "Pan," which is suddenly attacked by a mysterious alien force.

The aliens have the unique power to consume any living thing, as well as machines and buildings. Pan soon becomes overtaken by the alien force, and the army of Pan begins to succumb to the onslaught. The soldiers and people of Pan are told to evacuate the planet. However, a captain of the army, Max Maverick, refuses to leave. He instead suits up for battle and faces the aliens alone, using a motorcycle and hovercraft as his means of transportation. Max must stop the alien menace or face the destruction of his world.

Reception 

Isolated Warrior received mostly positive reception from critics. Famitsus four reviewers stated that the game felt similar to both Zaxxon and Solstice due to the pseudo 3D perspective and found it initially difficult to play because of this. Electronic Gaming Monthlys four reviewers commended the gameplay execution, graphics and music but criticized the amount of flickering that occurs when too many objects are present on-screen. Nintendo Power stated that the title's diagonal-based character action was well executed. Brazilian magazine VideoGame highly praised its audiovisual presentation and difficulty. Mean Machiness Richard Leadbetter and Julian Rignall disagreed with VideoGames opinion when it came to the difficulty level, which they felt it was easy and lowered its replay value for more experienced players. However, both Leadbetter and Rignall regarded it to be an entertaining shooter for the NES, giving positive comments to the presentation, varied visuals, sound and addictive gameplay. 

As with Famitsu, Joypads Alain Huyghues-Lacour and Sébastien Hamon noted that Isolated Warrior was similar to Zaxxon due to the pseudo 3D graphical perspective. Both Huyghues-Lacour and Hamon praised its visuals, sprite animations, frenetic action, controls and audio. In contrast, Joysticks Jean-François Morisse felt more mixed towards the audiovisual presentation and controls but nevertheless gave the title a positive recommendation. Similarly, Player Ones Cyril Drevet gave positive remarks to the isometric graphics, sprite animations, sound and difficutly but he felt mixed in regards to the longevity and overall gameplay. Total!s Andy Dyer highly commended the graphics due to their hand drawn alien-esque presentation and visual effects, use of a password system, replayability and frantic gameplay. However, Dyer criticized said gameplay for being repetitive due to the long levels, odd soundtrack and flickering. 

Retrospective reviews have been mixed, though most gave it a recommendation. AllGames Brett Alan Weiss criticized the game's two technical shortcomings (flickering and slowdown), but commended the visual presentation for the character designs as well as the colorful and detailed environments. However, Weiss remarked that the game was "rather ordinary" besides its isometric perspective. Hardcore Gaming 101s Michael Plasket noted that the title was the only isometric shooter on NES but criticized its difficult fourth stage, imprecise hit detection due to the viewing perspective and requirement to reach the true final stage.

Notes

References

External links 

 Isolated Warrior at GameFAQs
 Isolated Warrior at MobyGames

1991 video games
KID games
Nintendo Entertainment System games
Nintendo Entertainment System-only games
VAP (company) games
Video games developed in Japan
Video games with isometric graphics